Reflections of Ol' Golden Eye is a compilation album of cover versions by Australian rock guitarist Ed Kuepper, released in 1999. It contains 16 songs that had appeared on Kuepper albums from the 1990s, with almost half them drawn from two albums, The Wheelie Bin Affair (1997) and the limited release, mail order-only Exotic Mail Order Moods (1995). One song, a 10-minute version of Del Shannon's 1961 pop hit "Runaway", had first appeared on a live album by Kuepper's band The Aints.

Other artists whose songs were covered on the album included David Bowie, Gordon Lightfoot, Nick Cave, Ricky Nelson, Slim Dusty and The Loved Ones.

Track listing

References

Ed Kuepper albums
1999 compilation albums
Hot Records albums